Kumili is a historical village and panchayat in Pusapatirega mandal of Vizianagaram district, Andhra Pradesh, India.

History
Kumili was the former seat of the erstwhile Vizianagaram Kingdom. Ruins of this mud fort still exist here.

Kumili village's former name was Khumbilapuram. Vizianagaram Kingdom was first established in this village and they build a mud fort here. Later moved their capital to near by village Potnur and finally they established in Vizianagaram by building new fort and moved their capital there.

In 1607 Trailanga Swami was born.

Demographics
The village has a population of 5,929 and about 1,300 houses in 2001. Males constitutes 2,991 and Females 2938 of the population.

References

External links
Tourism site

Villages in Vizianagaram district